Motorcycle drag racing (also known as "sprints") involves two participants lining up at a dragstrip with a signaled starting line. The rider to reach the finish line first is the winner. The best-known form of motorcycle drag racing is the Pro Stock Bike category, although several other categories exist, including Top Fuel and Pro Street.

Motorcycles in the Top Fuel category are fueled by nitro methane and can make nearly 1,500 horsepower. From a standing start they can cover the first 60 feet in less than a second and can reach 200 mph in less than eighth-mile or 660 feet.
The current world record is held by Top Fuel Veteran Larry "Spiderman" McBride who covered the quarter-mile in 5.50 seconds at 264 MPH on 21 November 2019 recorded at South Georgia Motorsports Park.

Elmer Trett is considered by many to be the greatest motorcycle drag racer ever. Before his untimely death in 1996 at Indianapolis Raceway Park, Trett recorded a 6.06.

Gallery

See also
 Motorcycle sport
 Sportbike motorcycle drag racing
 Drag racing 
 Top Fuel

References

 
Drag racing
Motorcycle racing by type